Coppedge is a surname. Notable people with the surname include:

C. C. Coppedge (1830–1898), Texas Infantry officer and politician
Fern Coppedge (1883–1951), American painter
Susan P. Coppedge, American attorney and diplomat